The 2022 Campeonato Brasileiro Série B (officially the Brasileirão SportingBet - Série B 2022 for sponsorship reasons) was a football competition held in Brazil, equivalent to the second division. The competition began on 8 April and ended on 6 November.

Twenty teams competed in the tournament, twelve returning from the 2021 season, four promoted from the 2021 Campeonato Brasileiro Série C (Criciúma, Ituano, Novorizontino and Tombense), and four relegated from the 2021 Campeonato Brasileiro Série A (Bahia, Chapecoense, Grêmio and Sport). 

The top four teams were promoted to the 2023 Campeonato Brasileiro Série A. Cruzeiro became the first club to be promoted on 21 September 2022 after a 3–0 win against Vasco da Gama. Grêmio were promoted on 23 October 2022, and Bahia and Vasco da Gama were promoted on 6 November 2022.

Brusque, CSA, Náutico and Operário Ferroviário were relegated to the 2023 Campeonato Brasileiro Série C.

The match Sport v Vasco da Gama, played on 16 October 2022 (1–1, 35th round), ended in the 49th minute of the second half, 8 minutes before the end of injury time. Before the suspension of the match, Raniel (Vasco da Gama) scored a penalty goal and during his celebration, close to the Sport fans, objects were thrown onto the field of play towards the players. After this, an invasion of many fans began and the match was suspended. The referee Raphael Claus waited 50 minutes before decide to end of the match.

On 9 November 2022, Sport were sanctioned by the Superior Tribunal de Justiça Desportiva (STJD) with a fine of R$180,000, eight host matches behind closed doors and the loss of one point, while Vasco da Gama received two additional points. The STJD partially overruled their decision, on 31 January 2023, and the sanction was reduced to R$150,000 and six host matches behind closed doors.

Teams
Twenty teams competed in the league – twelve teams from the previous season, as well as four teams promoted from the Série C, and four teams relegated from the Série A.

Criciúma, Ituano, Novorizontino and Tombense achieved promotion on 7 November 2021, after knocking out Botafogo-PB and Paysandu from the Group A, and Manaus and Ypiranga from the Group B.

Chapecoense became the first team relegated on 10 November 2021, after Santos defeated Bragantino. Sport suffered relegation on 30 November, after Juventude also defeated Bragantino, with Grêmio and Bahia being relegated in the last round on 9 December, despite the former's win over champions Atlético Mineiro.

Number of teams by state

Stadiums and locations

Personnel and kits

Managerial changes

Notes

Foreign players
The clubs could have a maximum of five foreign players in their Campeonato Brasileiro squads per match, but there was no limit of foreigners in the clubs' squads.

Players holding Brazilian dual nationality
They do not take foreign slot.

  Renan Bressan (Criciúma)
  Rômulo (Cruzeiro)
  Henrique Luvannor (Cruzeiro)

League table

Positions by round
The table lists the positions of teams after each week of matches. In order to preserve chronological evolvements, any postponed matches were not included to the round at which they were originally scheduled, but added to the full round they were played immediately afterwards.

Results

Top goalscorers

Awards

References

Campeonato Brasileiro Série B seasons
2
2022 in Brazilian football